The High Council of Public Finances (HCFP) is an independent fiscal oversight body created by the Organic Law 2012-1403 in December 2012 by the french government in the framework European Union budgetary coordination. 
Its aim is to evaluate the assumptions made by the government in relation to the budgets and to ensure the coherence of public finances with the European budgetary agreements and pacts to which France is party. The HCFP operates under the responsibility of the Court of Audit.

Legal basis 
The HCFP operates under the authority granted to it by;
 Organic Law 2012-1403 on public finances governance
 European Budgetary Pact

Objective 
The HCFP reports of the following variables used by the government when setting the budget;

 GDP growth rate
 Revenues & Spending by central & local government and public bodies
 Revenues & Spending of the Social Security system
 Deviations between previous year forecasts and assumptions and outcomes

Members 
The membership comprises 11 members who are not remunerated. Four members are magistrates of the Court of Auditors, four members are designated by;
 the president of the national Assembly
 the president of the Senate
 the president of the Finance Commission of the National Assembly
 the president of the Finance Commission of the Senate
One member is designated by the President of the Economics, Social & Environment Council.
Members serve a single 5-year term with the exception of Court of Auditor magistrates who may serve a second term.

International coordination 
The HCFP is a member of the EU Independent Fiscal Institutions Network set up by the EU in September 2015.

See also 

 Fiscal council
EU Independent Fiscal Institutions Network
 Court of Audit (Belgium)
 Parliamentary Budget Officer (Canada)
 National Assembly Budget Office (Korea)
 Congressional Budget Office (United States)
 CPB Netherlands Bureau for Economic Policy Analysis (Netherlands)
 Independent Authority for Fiscal Responsibility (Spain)
 Office of Budget Responsibility

References

External links 
 [www.hcfp.fr/ Official web of HCFP]

External links

Government agencies established in 2012
Eurozone
Policy and political reactions to the Eurozone crisis
Fiscal federalism
2015 in the European Union
Multi-speed Europe